This is a list of supermarket chains in Switzerland.

See also 
 List of supermarket chains

Bibliography 
  Marc Benoun, Le commerce de détail suisse , collection « Le savoir suisse », Presses polytechniques et universitaires romandes, 2015.

Supermarkets
Supermarkets
Switzerland